The 14th Airlanding Brigade was a formation of the British Indian Army and then the Pakistan Army. It was formed from the 14th British Infantry Brigade on 1 November 1944, and was initially part of the 44th Airborne Division. Initially the brigade included 4/6th Rajputana Rifles, 2nd Black Watch, 2nd King's Own Royal Regiment, and 6/16th Punjab Regiment. During the Second World War it was commanded by Brigadier Thomas Brodie and later Brigadier F.W. Gibb.

Later as part of 2 Indian Airborne Division, the brigade headquarters was transferred to the Pakistan Army.

References

External links
 

Airborne infantry brigades of the British Army in World War II
Military units and formations established in 1944
Airborne infantry brigades of the United Kingdom
Airborne units and formations of Pakistan